The Women's featherweight boxing competitions at the 2022 Commonwealth Games in Birmingham, England took place between August 2 and 7th at National Exhibition Centre Hall 4. featherweights were limited to those boxers weighing between 54 and 57 kilograms.

Like all Commonwealth boxing events, the competition was a straight single-elimination tournament. Both semifinal losers were awarded bronze medals, so no boxers competed again after their first loss. Bouts consisted of three rounds of three minutes each, with one-minute breaks between rounds.

Schedule
The schedule is as follows:

Results
The draw is as follows:

Bracket

References

External link
Results

Boxing at the 2022 Commonwealth Games